Jonathan Danty (born 7 October 1992) is a French rugby union player. He plays at centre for Stade Rochelais in the Top 14.

International career

International tries

Honours

International 
 France
Six Nations Championship: 2022
Grand Slam: 2022

Club 
 Stade Français
Top 14: 2014–15
European Rugby Challenge Cup: 2016–2017

 La Rochelle
European Rugby Champions Cup: 2021–2022

References

External links
France profile at FFR
Ligue Nationale De Rugby Profile
 

Living people
1992 births
French rugby union players
France international rugby union players
Rugby union centres